Daniil Medvedev defeated Pierre-Hugues Herbert in the final, 6–4, 6–7(4–7), 6–4 to capture the men's singles tennis title at the 2021 Open 13 Provence.

Stefanos Tsitsipas was the two-time defending champion, but lost in the quarterfinals to Herbert.

Medvedev overtook Rafael Nadal as the number 2 ranking following the tournament. This marked the first time in over 15 years that someone outside of the Big Four has been ranked number 2, the last person being Lleyton Hewitt on July 18, 2005.

Seeds
The top four seeds received a bye into the second round.

Draw

Finals

Top half

Bottom half

Qualifying

Seeds

Qualifiers

Qualifying draw

First qualifier

Second qualifier

Third qualifier

Fourth qualifier

References

External links
 Main draw
 Qualifying draw

2021 ATP Tour
2021 Open 13 Provence - 1